José Vélez Fernández (born 1966) is a Spanish Socialist Workers' Party (PSOE) politician.

Biography
Born in Calasparra, Region of Murcia, Vélez graduated in Labour Relations and Human Resources from the University of Murcia. He then became a member of the management board at the Murcian Health Service.

Vélez was voted onto his hometown's council in 1999. In October 2014, he was elected mayor after the resignation of Jesús Navarro due to poor approval ratings. He renewed his mandate in 2015 and 2019, and resigned in February 2020 when named the Government Delegate for the region.

In November 2021, Vélez was voted secretary general of the Socialist Party of the Region of Murcia (PSRM) with 2,867 votes, compared to 567 for former regional minister Lourdes Retuerto.

References

1966 births
Living people
Politicians from the Region of Murcia
University of Murcia alumni
Spanish Socialist Workers' Party politicians
Mayors of places in the Region of Murcia